Duel for Gold (US: Huo bing ) is a 1971 Hong Kong martial arts film directed by Chor Yuen and produced by Shaw Brothers Studio, starring Ivy Ling Po, Lo Lieh, Chin Han, Wang Ping, Tsung Hua and Chen Chun. The screenplay was written by Ni Kuang.

Plot

Six swordsmen, including two sisters and their husbands, a ranger and a security man, are after millions of taels of gold stored in a secure vault in Datong Prefecture, and betray and outwit each other during their quest.

Two sister acrobats, Meng Yu Yieh (Ivy Ling Po) and Meng Yu Ying (Wang Ping), arrive in a town known to be rich in silver and gold. They do street performances and dangerous sword stunts until Yieh is apparently injured. In the emergency they are taken into the nearby treasury house. Chief treasury guard Wen (Richard Chan Chun) determines her injuries are fake and a fight ensues.

Cast

 Chin Han as Master Shen / Meng Lung
 Ivy Ling Po as Meng Yu Yen
 Lieh Lo as 'Lone Shadow' Teng Chi Yan
 Wang Ping as Meng Yu Ying
 Richard Chan Chun as Wen Li Hsien / Wen San Hu
 Mei Sheng Fan as 'Steward' Chiu
 Siu Loi Chow as Chiu's cohort
 Hua Chung as Hua Tieh Erh
 Sai Gwa-Pau as Waiter
 Chun Erh as Treasury Security Guard
 Wei Lieh Lan as Treasury Security Guard
 Hsiao Chung Li as Treasury Manager
 Peng-Fei Li as Treasury Sargeant Chang
 Han Lo as Treasury Proprietor
 Fan Mei-Sheng as Qiu Fu
 Lee Pang-Fei as Sergeant Chang
 Chung Wa as Hua Dieh Er
 Tong Tin-Hei as Steward Chiu's partner
 Yeung Chak-Lam as Steward Chiu's partner
 Wong Wai as Steward Chiu's partner
 Lee Tin-Ying as Steward Chiu's partner
 Law Hon as Bank boss
 Lee Siu-Chung as Bank manager
 Lau Kwan as Bank clerk
 Little Unicorn as Bank Security Guard
 Simon Chui Yee-Ang as Bank Security Guard
 Yue Man-Wa as Bank Security Guard
 Yee Kwan as Bank Security Guard
 Lan Wei-Lieh as Bank Security Guard
 Tony Lee Wan-Miu as Constable
 Lam Siu as Constable
 Wu Por as Constable
 Kong Lung as Constable
 Kwan Yan as Constable
 Yue Hong as Waiter
 Woo Wai as Waiter
 Tsang Choh-Lam as Brothel worker
 Kwok Chuk-Hing as Prostitute
 Wong Kung-Miu as Servant
 Chow Siu-Loi as Chou
 Max Lee Chiu-Jun as Bank Security Guard
 Hung Ling-Ling as Prostitute

Release
The film's original Mandarin title was Huo bing, its Hong Kong Cantonese title was Fo ping and the working English language title Thieves Fall Out. After release the film's worldwide English subtitled version was titled Duel for Gold.

Reception

References

External links

1971 films
Hong Kong martial arts films
1970s action films
1970s Mandarin-language films
Wuxia films
1970s Hong Kong films